The Desert Biosphere Reserve and Experimental Range  is a biosphere reserve and experimental range in western Millard County, Utah, United States, that is listed as a historic district on the National Register of Historic Places.

Description
The experimental range was established in 1933 when  of public lands were designated "as an agricultural range experiment station" by President Herbert Hoover.

The range is maintained by the U.S. Forest Service's Rocky Mountain Research Station. It was declared a biosphere reserve by UNESCO in 1976 but was withdrawn from the program as of June 14, 2017. It protects a landscape typical of the Great Basin, with its typical geography of north–south aligned mountain ranges separated by desert basins. Vegetation is typical of the Great Basin shrub steppe, with shadscale saltbush (Atriplex confertifolia) and sagebrush (Artemisia spp.) scrublands predominant. The reserve also includes areas of Single-leaf Pinyon (Pinus monophylla) juniper woodland and pasture land.

See also

 National Register of Historic Places listings in Millard County, Utah

References

External links

 Desert Experimental Forest (USDA Forest Service)
 Desert Biosphere Reserve (UNESCO)

Former biosphere reserves of the United States
Protected areas of Millard County, Utah
Historic districts on the National Register of Historic Places in Utah
National Register of Historic Places in Millard County, Utah